The Leipzig Opera is an opera house and opera company located at the Augustusplatz and the Inner City Ring Road at its east side in Leipzig's district Mitte, Germany.

History
Performances of opera in Leipzig trace back to Singspiel performances beginning in the year 1693. The composer of many early operas at the first opera house, the Oper am Brühl, was Telemann. He was director of the house from 1703 to 1705.

The Leipzig Opera does not have its own opera orchestra – the Leipzig Gewandhaus Orchestra performs as its orchestra. This relationship began in 1766 with performances of the Singspiel  by Johann Adam Hiller.

Opera House, 1868

The previous theater (the "") was inaugurated on 28 January 1868 with Jubilee Overture by Carl Maria von Weber and the overture for Iphigénie en Aulide by Gluck and Goethe's play Iphigenia in Tauris. From 1886 to 1888, Gustav Mahler was the second conductor; Arthur Nikisch was his superior. During an air raid in the night of 3 December 1943, part of the bombing of Leipzig in World War II, the theater was destroyed, as were all of Leipzig's theatres.

Opera House, 1960
Construction of the modern opera house began in 1956. The theater was inaugurated on 8 October 1960 with a performance of Wagner's Die Meistersinger von Nürnberg.

Since 2009, Ulf Schirmer is the Generalmusikdirektor (General Music Director, or GMD); he was elected artistic director in 2011 for a five-year term.

General music directors 
Among the people with the title Generalmusikdirektor (GMD) were

 Arthur Nikisch (1878)
 Gustav Mahler (1886–1888)
 Otto Lohse (1912)
 Gustav Brecher (1923)
 Paul Schmitz (1932)
 Helmut Seydelmann (1951)
 Paul Schmitz (1964)
 Lothar Zagrosek (1990–1992)
 Jiří Kout (1993)
 Michail Jurowski (1999)
 Riccardo Chailly (2005–2008)
 Ulf Schirmer (2009–present)

World premieres
Several operas received their premiere in Leipzig, including:

 1826: Oberon by Weber (first production in Germany)
 1828: Der Vampyr by Marschner
 1837: Zar und Zimmermann by Lortzing
 1850: Genoveva by Schumann
 1902:  by Felix Weingartner
1906: The Wreckers by Ethel Smyth
 1927: Jonny spielt auf by Krenek
 1930: Aufstieg und Fall der Stadt Mahagonny by Weill
 1931: Die Blume von Hawaii by Abraham
 1933: Der Silbersee by Weill
 1937: Viola by Ludwig Schmidseder
 1943: Catulli Carmina by Orff
 1966: Guyana Johnny by Alan Bush
 1971: Der zerbrochne Krug by Fritz Geißler
 1988: Der Idiot by Karl Ottomar Treibmann
 1991: Matka by Annette Schlünz
 1993: Nachtwache by Jörg Herchet
 1993: Dienstag from Licht by Stockhausen
 1996: Freitag from Licht by Stockhausen
 1997: Abraum by Jörg Herchet
 2001: Persephone oder der Ausgleich der Welten by Günter Neubert
 2006: Der schwarze Mönch by Philippe Hersant
 2009: Rituale – eine Tanzoper für Georg Friedrich Händel by Heike Hennig
 2009: Das Wesentliche ist unsichtbar, production of the opera's children's choir
 2010: Monsieu Mathieu, was wird? production of the opera's children's choir with schools, music by Bruno Coulais and Christophe Barratier
 2011: Was, wäre, wenn? production of the opera's children's choir
 2011: Waldrandgeflüster, produktion of the opera's youth and children's choir
 2015: The Canterville Ghost by Gordon Getty

References

External links

 
Interview with Damien Diaz, Principal Dancer under Uwe Scholz

Opera houses in Germany
German opera companies
Buildings and structures in Leipzig
Tourist attractions in Leipzig
Theatres completed in 1693
Music venues completed in 1693
Theatres completed in 1868
Music venues completed in 1868
Theatres completed in 1960
Music venues completed in 1960
1693 establishments in the Holy Roman Empire